Speed Demon is a 2003 Canadian-American horror film and directed by David DeCoteau and starring Collin Stark, Mark Ian Miller, and Candace Moon.

Plot
Jesse returns home from college following the death of his mechanic father. He hooks back up with his brother Mikey and members of the muscle car-driving gang he used to hang with. Otto, the leader of the gang, has in his possession a "speed demon," an ancient demon bound in an amulet.

Mikey challenges Otto to a race and is killed when his car explodes. Grief-stricken, Jesse discovers another speed demon amulet in his home and remembers his father performing a ritual with it. Jesse performs the ritual and one by one the members of Otto's gang are killed by a mysterious black-clad helmeted driver.

As his gang dwindles and desperate to cement his hold on power, Otto challenges Jesse to a showdown. He believes that Jesse has tapped the power of his speed demon. Actually, it's Jesse's girlfriend who's been acting as the masked driver all along. She destroys Otto.

Cast
 Collin Stark as Jesse
 Mark Ian Miller as Otto
 Candace Moon as Natalie
 M.T. Church as Chain Gang
 Trevor Harris as Mikey
 Greg Carney as Wiper
 Jared Edwards as Axle
 Amber Loy as Chopper
 Nick Doss as Clutch
 Mike Cole as Road Rage

References

External links
 
  
 

Canadian direct-to-video films
2003 horror films
2003 direct-to-video films
2003 independent films
American direct-to-video films
American auto racing films
American supernatural horror films
American LGBT-related films
English-language Canadian films
2000s chase films
LGBT-related horror films
The Asylum films
Films directed by David DeCoteau
Canadian auto racing films
Canadian supernatural horror films
Canadian LGBT-related films
2003 LGBT-related films
2003 films
2000s English-language films
2000s American films
2000s Canadian films